Michael Stephen Botur (born 8 March 1984) is a New Zealand author described as "one of the most original story writers of his generation in New Zealand."

Life and career
Born in Christchurch, Botur first began publishing poetry and experimental fiction as an English major at the University of Otago. He was part of a group publishing the creative writing zine Blindswimmer.
Botur's earliest creative writing publication credits, between 2004 and 2009, were in New Zealand and international literary magazines, zines and websites including Takahe, JAAM, Bravado, The Lumiere Reader, Prima Storia, Deep South, Catalyst, Sidestream, Insight, Subject, Blindswimmer, A3, Critic, Potroast, Debate and F*nk, Canada's The Med and NiL. He won the Her magazine short story competition in 2008. Botur completed a Master of Creative Writing degree in 2009 at Auckland University of Technology, publishing a collection of short stories as his thesis including a dissertation on subcultures, then trained as a journalist with Massey University, graduating at the beginning of 2015. Botur essayed in The Spinoff on 26 July 2017 about moving to Northland in 2015 and "finding income and inspiration in its very small economy", working at The Warehouse and other labour-intensive jobs, and finding story ideas.

In 2019, Botur was featured at the Rotorua Noir Crime Writing Festival.

In mid-2019, Botur launched a programme of publishing short stories every day for 100 days on social media and encouraged other New Zealand writers to do the same. The #100NZStories100days campaign encouraged Kiwi writers to post links to flash fiction and short prose already published in literary magazines and blogs. Botur said in an NZ Book Council news story: "I have a philosophy of ‘There’s no time like the present’ with a lot of my publishing. Fiction writers endure many forces which delay the publication of our work when we're keen to share it with the world. Life is short and I don't think it's right that publishers and competitions will keep an author waiting up to 12 months to share their work with the world."

Botur published Loudmouth: Page and Pub Poems under the Wild West Writing imprint in December 2019 and began touring the book. Launched in Whangarei 6 December 2019, Loudmouth has been performed in Auckland, Rotorua, Tauranga and Christchurch.

Loudmouth: Page and Pub Poems has been or is scheduled to be performed at festivals including: 
Rotorua Noir - 26 January 2019  
Whangarei Fringe Festival - 19 October 2020. 
Earth Beat Festival - 20 March 2021 
In January 2021 Botur received a grant to perform Loudmouth: Page and Pub Poems and deliver creative writing workshops in Tauranga. 
Botur recorded Loudmouth as an album and launched on Spotify, iTunes, Bandcamp and Amazon Music in March 2021 and an official launch in Whangarei on 1 April 2021.

Published works
Botur's published works include:
The Devil Took Her: Tales of Horror (2022) 
The Lockdownland Trilogy (2022) 
My Animal Family: (2021) 
Moneyland: Payback (2020)
Hell of a Thing: Sixteen stories (2020)
Crimechurch (2020)
Loudmouth: page and pub poems (2019) 
True? (2018)
Moneyland, a science fiction dystopian novel (2018)
Lowlife(2017)
Spitshine (2016)
Mean: short stories (2013)
Hot Bible! (2012)

His latest novel The Devil Took Her will be released by The Sager Group in 2022.

Awards
Botur's awards and nominations include:
Whangarei Flash Fiction Award - 1st Place for Dad, Here's Us 
Short story Test of Death won the Australasian Horror Writers Association short story award
Crime fiction novelCrimechurch - nominated for the 2021 Ngaio Marsh Awards for New Zealand crime fiction writing.
Crimechurch - entered in the 2021 Ockham NZ Book Awards.
Short story collection Hell of a Thing - entered in the 2021 Ockham NZ Book Awards.
Novel Moneyland: Payback - nominated for the Best Youth Novel, 2021 Sir Julius Vogel Awards.
Horror stories The Writing on the Rat and The Day I Skipped School nominated for the Sir Julius Vogel Awards 2021.
Short Story Land 6-Month Competition - 1st place 2019 
Whangarei Libraries Flash Fiction Competition 2019 – 2nd 
Northland Short Story Award – for highest Northland place in the National Flash Fiction Day Competition 
North & South Short Story Story Competition 2019 – 2nd 
Whangarei Libraries Flash Fiction Comp 2015 – first and second place winner
Guest Fiction Writer (August 2014) – Tākahe magazine
Miles Hughes Award – third place in 2014
Takahe poetry competition 2012 – runner-up
Dan Davin Literary Award 2009 – highly commended
NZSA Short Story Competition 2008/09 – third place, for ‘Latter Day Lepers’
Kiwi Short Story Competition, 2009 – second place, for ‘Home D’
Her magazine Short Story Competition, 2008 – winner
F*nk short short story competition, 2005 – second

References 

1984 births
Living people
New Zealand writers
People from Christchurch
University of Otago alumni
Massey University alumni
Auckland University of Technology alumni
New Zealand male poets
New Zealand male short story writers